Brutal Assault is an open-air extreme metal festival that takes place in the 18th-century army fortress Josefov, located in Jaroměř, Czechia. It is held each August early in the month from Wednesday until Saturday. The festival started in 1996, originally focused on grindcore. For many years, it was a small event with mainly Czech and Slovak bands performing. It changed location several times and grew into a large event by 2006, when over 7,000 people attended the festival in Svojšice. After moving to Josefov, attendances grew further to 15,000 in 2012 and the festival has operated two alternating main stages since. Currently, Brutal Assault features artists that perform all forms of extreme metal, including some of the genre's most prominent figures, as well as artists with dark and intense styles from genres outside of heavy metal such as punk rock, experimental rock and electronic. The festival motto is: "Against violence and intolerance".

Location

Brutal Assault takes place in Josefov, an army fortress built between 1780 and 1787 by Emperor Joseph II on the left bank of the Elbe and Mettau rivers near Jaroměř. The two main stages are built against the fortress walls.

Safety
Stealing from the tents and bodies of drunk visitors is common at Brutal Assault. Guests are advised to keep their valuables in safe places (e.g. deposit boxes provided by the festival organisers for a fee, locked inside the trunk of a car, etc.).

The festival area at Brutal Assault in Josefov is near a hill, which can be difficult to navigate. Nicknamed "the hill of death", it becomes muddy and slippery after rain. The hill can be walked around, however, and the site is fully accessible to disabled visitors.

2014 

The nineteenth annual festival was held from Wednesday 6 August to Saturday 9 August 2014. It was headlined by Slayer, Amon Amarth, Satyricon, Venom, Bring Me the Horizon, Children of Bodom, Devin Townsend and Down. Three bands were announced but eventually had to be cancelled: Strife, Arsonists Get All the Girls and Gorguts (who were instead announced for Brutal Assault 2015).

References

External links 

Heavy metal festivals in the Czech Republic
Rock festivals in the Czech Republic
Experimental music festivals
Recurring events established in 1996
1996 establishments in the Czech Republic
Tourist attractions in the Hradec Králové Region
August events
Summer events in the Czech Republic